Ramon Eduardo Rodriguez (April 7, 1932 – February 20, 2013), better known by the ring name Ciclón Negro (Black Cyclone), was a professional wrestler who was originally from Venezuela. He toured the Australia, Canada, Japan, Puerto Rico and the United States. He achieved a good amount of popularity and recognition during the 1970s.

Background
Negro was born in San Felipe, Venezuela on April 7, 1932. In his early days he was a welder, an occupation he would return to in later years. At the height of his popularity he was recognized as being one of the best wrestlers of the day. He was also something of a showman and broke boards and objects over his head to show how hard it was. He was successful in the 1970s with his matches against Dory Funk Sr. and Terry Funk.

Professional wrestling career

1950s to 1960s
Negro had a 28-year career that lasted until his retirement in the 1980s. He was also responsible for helping the careers of two wrestlers,  Omar Atlas and Mario Milano, the latter who he helped bring to the United States.

He trained as a boxer in his early days. In 1951, he fought Floyd Patterson in the Pan-American Games. Due to his physique and increase in size, he switched to wrestling, becoming a pro wrestler in 1956. He went under the name of Ciclon Venezuelano which in English meant the Venezuelan Cyclone. He had met Omar Atlas in a gym and they became friends. It was Negro who introduced Atlas to wrestling and thus kick started his career. Negro went to Europe in 1958 and over the next six years at various stages, he wrestled in Spain, France, Belgium, England, Germany and Italy.

1970s to 1980s
In 1974, Negro defeated Brute Bernard in New York for the World Brass Knuckles Championship. In 1978, he defeated Dusty Rhodes and took the NWA Florida Heavyweight title. In 1982, he defeated El Monarca and took the NWA Americas Heavyweight title. In 1984, he retired form wrestling.

Death
Negro died February 20, 2013, at age 80.

Championships and accomplishments
All Japan Pro Wrestling
NWA International Tag Team Championship (1 time) – with Killer Karl Kox
American Wrestling Alliance
AWA World Tag Team Championship (1 time) – with The Masked Terror
Big Time Wrestling (San Francisco)
NWA California State Heavyweight Championship (1 time)
NWA World Tag Team Championship (San Francisco version) (1 time) – with The Mongolian Stomper
Capitol Sports Promotions
WWC Caribbean Heavyweight Championship (2 times)
WWC North American Tag Team Championship (1 time) – with Huracán Castillo
Championship Wrestling from Florida
NWA Florida Heavyweight Championship (2 times)
NWA Brass Knuckles Championship (Florida version) (2 times)
NWA Fort Myers Heavyweight Championship (1 time)
NWA World Tag Team Championship (Florida version) (6 times) – with Jack Brisco (2), Sam Steamboat, Omar Negro (2) and Pak Song
International Wrestling Alliance
IWA World Tag Team Championship (3 times) – with Baron Mikel Scicluna
Japan Wrestling Association
All Asia Tag Team Championship (1 time) – with Gene Kiniski
Mid-Atlantic Championship Wrestling
NWA Brass Knuckles Championship (Mid-Atlantic version) (1 time)
NWA Hollywood Wrestling
NWA Americas Heavyweight Championship (1 time)
NWA Brass Knuckles Championship (Los Angeles version) (2 times)
NWA Southwest Sports
NWA Texas Heavyweight Championship (1 time)
NWA World Tag Team Championship (3 times) – with Dory Dixon, Oscar Salazar and Ricki Starr
NWA Texas Tag Team Championship (4 times) – with Torbellino Blanco (3) and Dory Dixon
NWA Tri-State
NWA United States Tag Team Championship (Tri-State version) (1 time) – Dr. X
NWA Western States Sports
NWA Western States Heavyweight Championship (6 times)
NWA Brass Knuckles Championship (Amarillo version) (3 times)
NWA International Heavyweight Championship (Amarillo version) (2 times)
NWA Rocky Mountain Heavyweight Championship (2 times)
NWA Western States Heavyweight Championship (1 time) – with Karl Von Steiger
World Championship Wrestling
NWA Austra-Asian Heavyweight Championship (1 time)
World Brass Knuckles Championship (1 time)

References

External links
Slam Sports: Singing a song of Ciclon Negro
Ciclón Negro at Cagematch.net
Cyclone Negro at Wrestlingdata.com

1932 births
2013 deaths
Venezuelan male professional wrestlers
Masked wrestlers
Venezuelan male boxers
People from Yaracuy
Stampede Wrestling alumni
20th-century professional wrestlers
All Asia Tag Team Champions
NWA Florida Heavyweight Champions
NWA Florida Tag Team Champions
NWA Brass Knuckles Champions (Florida version)
NWA Americas Heavyweight Champions
NWA Austra-Asian Heavyweight Champions
IWA World Tag Team Champions (Australia)
World Brass Knuckles Champions
NWA International Tag Team Champions